The Grammar School of King Edward VI at Stratford-upon-Avon (commonly referred to as King Edward VI School or shortened to K.E.S.) is a grammar school and academy in Stratford-upon-Avon, Warwickshire, England, traditionally for boys only. However, since September 2013 the school has admitted girls into the Sixth Form. It is almost certain that William Shakespeare attended this school, leading to the school widely being described as "Shakespeare's School".

History
There has been an educational facility at the current site of the school since at least the early thirteenth century - established by the Guild of the Holy Cross, the School can trace its origins to May 1295, when in the Register of Deacons of the Diocese of Worcester there is the record of the ordination of Richard as rector scholarum, to teach the basics of learning the alphabet, psalters, and religious rites to boys. A schoolroom, schoolhouse and payment of £20 per annum for a master was one of the provisions of King Edward VI's charter which established Stratford-upon-Avon as a borough in June, 1553. The school was re-founded as one of King Edward's schools nine days before the young king died of tuberculosis and is believed to be the last of the King Edward VI Schools. A history of the early years of the school has been published by the former chairman of the governors Levi Fox.

It is likely that the playwright and poet William Shakespeare attended the school between the ages of seven and fourteen.  His father, John Shakespeare, a glover and wool dealer in the town, held the office of bailiff of the borough in 1568. As a child, William would have been entitled to a free place at the school, and it was the only school for miles around, however there is no conclusive evidence that he was schooled there. Classmates may have included William Smith, Richard Field, John Sadler, Arthur Cawdrey, John Lane, Robert Dibdale and Thomas Green.

Following a tradition established in 1893, each year on Shakespeare's birthday, pupils and masters lead a procession through the town from the school in Church Street to Holy Trinity Church, where they lay flowers at Shakespeare's grave. In 1982 the five-hundredth anniversary of the endowment of the school by the priest Thomas Jolyffe was celebrated and in 2003 celebrations were held for the 450th anniversary of the school's re-foundation.

Administration
The school is currently led by the Headmaster, Mr. Bennet Carr MA FRGS, and the Chair of Governors, Mr Victor Matts. The Head Boy/Girl is elected by the students of the Lower Sixth and teachers. It is a former voluntary aided school and became an academy on 17 August 2011.

Admissions
KES is a completely selective, single-sex school: to enter the school, all students must pass a selective exam, primarily the 11-plus, which is taken in Year 6 (ages 10 and 11) across Warwickshire. Students must be male to be eligible for a place in the school. More recently, female students have been allowed into the sixth form.

Houses
In 1921, the headmaster, the Revd. A. Cecil Knight, established six houses to promote healthy competition amongst the boys. This number was reduced to four houses in 1924: Shakespeare, Flower (after Charles Flower, a benefactor of the school in the 1890s), Warneford, and De La Warr (Earl Delawarr was High Steward of Stratford in the 1850s). The house system was altered in 1973 and just two houses established – King's (blue) and Guild (gold) – in recognition of the historic benefactors of the school.

In 2000 the number of boys at the school meant that more houses were needed to make true competition possible, and so four houses were re-introduced. These were named after men associated with the twentieth-century school who had made significant contributions in their respective fields. The houses are: Dyson (Red colours), Fitzmaurice (Blue), Spender (Purple) and Warneford (Green). Denis Dyson was a physics and astronomy master who came to the school in 1926, initially for six-months, and then he stayed until his retirement at the age of 71 in 1975. He continued to assist the school well into his nineties. Richard Spender was an old boy and poet who was killed assaulting German machine-gun positions in 1943. Reginald Warneford was an old boy who was the first naval airman to receive the Victoria Cross. He was killed in a flying accident in 1915.

School Council and Sixth Form Committee
There is a School Council, consisting of elected members from each year group, which provides a voice for the students in many different aspects of the school. The Sixth Form Committee organises charity events (such as cake sales and Macmillan coffee mornings), as well as providing a formal route for Year 12 and 13 students to voice concerns about Sixth Form-related matters.

Buildings
There are a variety of architectural styles on the site ranging from the fifteenth-century Guildhall to the Denis Dyson science building opened in 2008. The majority of the historic parts of the school are still used. The ground-floor of the Guildhall, where the town council of Shakespeare's time met and where travelling players performed - the holes for the rods to hold the temporary stage are still visible - was used as a library until February 2013. Having undergone restoration work, it is now open to the general public from 11am onwards each day.

On the first floor, known since Victorian times as "Big School", is the room in which William Shakespeare is believed to have been taught. The building known as Pedagogue's House across the courtyard currently houses the school office, the offices of the Headmaster and the two deputy headmasters. Pedagogue's House, first built in 1427 and believed to be the oldest half-timbered schoolroom in England, is attached to the Old Vicarage where the Headmaster lives. Adjacent to the school site is the Guild Chapel, founded by the medieval Guild of the Holy Cross and now owned by the Stratford-upon-Avon Town Trust. Today it is used by the school for morning service and various other school events, such as the annual carol service.

The other school buildings predominately date from the 1930s. Many were extended during the 1950s, 1960s and 1970s by Stratford architect Robert (Bob) Harvey. The departments of Biology and Chemistry are housed in the Denis Dyson Building (built in 2008) and contains 6 science labs. The most recent part of the school, built in 2017, is the Richard Spender Building, a three-storey block which offers new English classrooms, computing suites, and a library named after old boy Tim Pigott-Smith. The Levi Fox Hall, named after a Chairman of the Governors, is primarily used for sport, assemblies, school plays, concerts and examinations. The Royal Shakespeare Company has used the space for a production of Julius Caesar.

Student life
The school has the Warwickshire Mock Magistrates and Mock Bar court trials, Young Enterprise, Bank of England Target Two Point Zero Challenge.

Sport
The school's rugby team has had success in the Daily Mail Cup  (Winners 1991, Semi Finalists in 1996, Quarter Finalists on two occasions and in 2008/09 Vase Semi Finalists) and goes on annual international tours, most recently to Australia in 2014.  Students take part in fencing, athletics, rowing, hockey, basketball, badminton, table tennis, volleyball, netball and previously fives. Fencing is a sport at the school, with wins from pupils at several fencing tournaments.

Esports
The KES Esports team, called the Scorpions and formed in 2017, triumphed in tournaments run by Digital Schoolhouse (DSH) and the British Esports Association (BEA).

In 2019, the team won the National Esports Tournament in Overwatch, beating 3,500 secondary schools, followed by the BEA's Open National Tournament held at Insomnia, the UK's largest gaming festival attended by over 50,000 enthusiasts.

Music and theatre
The music department holds termly concerts and the King Eddie's Revival Big Band are frequently featured. The band has played at the 100 Club, Oxford Street, London. The school puts on an annual play; in 2005 the production was Unman, Wittering and Zigo, in 2006 Shakespeare's The Winter's Tale, in 2007 an adaption of Simon Armitage's The Odyssey, and in 2008 The Resistible Rise of Arturo Ui.

Edward's Boys
Established and run by deputy head Perry Mills, this theatre group developed out of the school's involvement with Michael Wood’s documentary series In Search of Shakespeare. In 2014 they were awarded an inaugural Owle Schreame Award for their production of his Galatea, and have since performed twice in the Sam Wanamaker Playhouse, London, as well as Lady Margaret Hall, Oxford, Christ Church, Oxford, and the Swan Theatre, Stratford-upon-Avon. The company recently toured to Montpellier, France, where they performed at L'Assomption School, the 'Maison des Choeurs', and 'SortieOuest'.

Notable former pupils

Born before 1900
 John de Stratford (died 1348): Archbishop of Canterbury and Treasurer and Chancellor of England. Brother of Robert.
 Robert de Stratford (died 9 April 1362): an English bishop, and was one of Edward III of England's principal ministers. Brother of John.
 Richard Field (or Feild) (1561–1624): printer and publisher in Elizabethan London, known for his close association with the poems of William Shakespeare.
 Robert Dibdale: possibly a pupil at the same time as William Shakespeare. Catholic Priest and martyr, martyred at Tyburn on 8 October 1586. Was declared Blessed by John Paul II on 22 November 1987.
 William Shakespeare (1564–1616): English playwright and poet; probable attendee.
 William Wyse: classical scholar.
 Reginald Alexander John Warneford (1891–1915): "Rex" Warnford was awarded the Victoria Cross in World War I as a Flight Sub-Lieutenant in the Royal Navy's 1 Squadron, RNAS for an action on 7 June 1915 at Ghent, Belgium. His Victoria Cross is displayed at the Fleet Air Arm Museum.
Richard Nelson Gale: General Sir Richard Nelson "Windy" Gale GCB, KBE, DSO, MC (1896–1982) was a soldier in the British Army who served in both world wars. In World War I he was awarded the Military Cross in 1918. In World War II he commanded the 6th Airborne Division during the invasion of Normandy and Operation Tonga in 1944.

Born after 1900
 Neil Codling: Musician - Keyboard Player in Suede.
 James Hayter: Rugby Player - Harlequins, Llanelli Scarlets, Coventry and Esher.
 Alex Henshaw (1912–2007): air-racing pilot in the 1930s and set long-distance flight records. During World War II he was chief production test pilot for the Supermarine Spitfire at the Vickers-Armstrongs plant at Castle Bromwich.
 Tim Pigott-Smith, OBE: (1946 - 2017) Actor. He acted regularly in performances of Shakespearian and Greek plays. He also made many appearances on radio, television and in film, including the films Clash of the Titans, Johnny English and the James Bond film Quantum of Solace.
 James Roe, MBE: Champion LTAMix4+ rower, Paralympic gold medallist, and repeated gold medallist at the World Rowing Championships
 Richard Tracey JP AM: represented Merton and Wandsworth on the London Assembly from 2008 to 2016, and former Conservative MP for Surbiton from 1983 to 1997 and Environment Minister.
 George Tremlett: former politician and biographer, left in 1957.
 James Cottriall: English musician. His most recent album, Common Ground, was nominated for Best Sound at the 2016 Amadeus Awards in Austria.

See also
 Stratford School, in the London Borough of Newham, also previously known as Stratford Grammar School

References

http://www.kes.net/wp-content/uploads/2013/04/Sixth-Form-Open-Evening-2012-Pack-FINAL.pdf

External links
 King Edward VI School - Stratford-upon-Avon
 Shakespeare's School - Stratford-upon-Avon The School's Historical Association.
 EduBase
 The School's Old Boys Association

Grammar schools in Warwickshire
Boys' schools in Warwickshire
Educational institutions established in the 13th century
13th-century establishments in England
Academies in Warwickshire
King Edward VI Schools
Buildings and structures in Stratford-upon-Avon
William Shakespeare